The Arabic journal al-Maʿrifa (DMG: al-Maʿrifa; English: "Knowledge") was published in Egypt between 1931 and 1934. The editor ʿAbd Al ʿAzīz Al-Islāmbūlī published it for three years and a total of 30 issues. The preface states that this monthly journal is sufistic oriented and aims to inform the readers scientifically and culturally. Not only art, culture and literature were addressed but above all scientific knowledge was published and discussed. According to the editor Al-Islāmbūlī sufistic moral and wisdom were not a priority but to be taken into account.

References

External links
 Online-Version: al-Maʿrifa
 Further information: www.translatio.uni-bonn.de
 Digital editions: Arabische, persische und osmanisch-türkische Periodika

1931 establishments in Egypt
1934 disestablishments in Egypt
Arabic-language magazines
Cultural magazines
Defunct magazines published in Egypt
Magazines about spirituality
Magazines established in 1931
Magazines disestablished in 1934
Monthly magazines published in Egypt